Jean Gabriel Marie may refer to:
Jean Gabriel Marie (1852–1928), French composer
Jean Gabriel Marie (1907–1970), his son, French romantic composer